The Pima Revolt, also known as the O'odham Uprising or the Pima Outbreak, was a revolt of Pima native Americans in 1751 against colonial forces in Spanish Arizona and one of the major northern frontier conflicts in early New Spain.

Background 
The revolt culminated from decades of violence by the local Spanish settlers against Indians beginning in 1684. The period was characterized by local Indians' gradual loss of autonomy and territory.  Treaties allowing the Spanish to mine and herd on Native lands led to an influx of new settlers; by 1760 Hispanos had become a substantial presence in the present-day American Southwest. However, the colonial province of Sonora was characterized by a larger native population, and more frequent conflict between them and the Spaniards. The Pima Indian Revolt was directly preceded by the Seri Revolt of Seri Indians in Sonora.

Uprising 
While the Pima people had no central authority, the charismatic Luis Oacpicagigua (Luis of Sáric) began the task of uniting—with varying degrees of success—the disparate groups, numbering at least 15,000 people, under a single war plan. The initial act of rebellion was the massacre of 18 settlers lured to Oacpicagigua's home in Sáric. In the ensuing three months, Oacpicagigua and more than a hundred other men attacked the mission at Tubutama, and other Spanish settlements, and more than a hundred settlers were killed. Oacpicagigua surrendered to Captain José Díaz del Carpio on March 18, 1752 after a negotiated peace. When the Pima leaders laid the blame for the revolt on Jesuit missionaries (who would be expelled from Spain and its colonies in 1767) they were pardoned by the colonial governor Ortiz Parrilla.

After the conflict 
Small scale conflict soon began again, however, and Oacpicagigua eventually died in a Spanish prison in 1755. The colonial government founded three new presidios in Sonora to control the Pima and Seri populace in the years after the revolt: San Ignacio de Tubac, Santa Gertrudis de Altar, and San Carlos de Buenavista, present-day Tubac, Arizona, Altar, Sonora, and Buenavista, Sonora, respectively. While intermittent rebellions continued, by the end of the eighteenth century, Sonoran natives had been largely missionized or Hispanicized, and the assimilated tribes of frontier New Spain were absorbed into the Spanish Empire.

References

External links 

 

Conflicts in 1751
Conflicts in 1752
1751 in New Spain
1752 in New Spain
18th-century rebellions
Pima Revolt
Pre-statehood history of Arizona
Colonial Mexico
Indigenous rebellions against the Spanish Empire